The men's 4 × 7.5 km relay competition at the Biathlon World Championships 2023 was held on 18 February 2023.

Results
The race was started at 11:45.

References

Men's relay